Thirlwell may refer to:

Adam Thirlwell (born 1978), British novelist
Curly Thirlwell, American sound engineer
J. G. Thirlwell (born 1960), Australian vocalist, composer and record producer
Paul Thirlwell (born 1979), English footballer
Robert Thirlwell, American sound engineer